The Ultimate Collection is a compilation album by the American vocalist, pianist and songwriter Oleta Adams, released in 2004.

Track listing 
Disc 1	
"Rhythm Of Life" - 4:18
"Circle Of One" - 3:52
"Get Here" - 4:35
"I've Got To Sing My Song" - 4:02
"You've Got To Give Me Room" - 5:15
"Don't Let The Sun Go Down On Me" - 5:54
"I Just Had To Hear Your Voice" - 3:39
"Hold Me For A While" - 5:09
"The Day I Stop Loving You" - 5:02
"My Heart Won't Lie" - 4:41
"When Love Comes To The Rescue" - 5:14
"Window Of Hope" - 4:21
"Oh Me, Oh My (I'm A Fool For You Baby)" - 4:40
"I Believe You" - 4:14
Disc 2
"Blessed With You" - 3:25
"No Secrets" - 4:08
"You Won't Get Away" - 5:56
"Never Knew Love" - 3:21
"I Knew You When" - 4:19
"We Will Meet Again" - 4:46
"New Star" - 4:17
"Once In A Lifetime" - 5:21
"You Need To Be Loved" - 4:39
"Between Hello And Goodbye" - 6:11
"Come And Walk With Me" - 6:07
"I Will Love You" - 5:30
"When You Walked Into My Life" - 4:16
"Learning To Love You More" - 4:25
Disc 3
"Woman In Chains" (featuring Tears For Fears) - 6:30
"Bad Man's Song" (featuring Tears For Fears) - 8:33
"I've Got To Sing My Song (Live)" - 4:32
"Get Here (Live)" - 4:54
"Slow Motion (Live)" - 4:20
"Life Keeps Moving On (Live)" - 4:35
"Rhythm Of Life (Reverend Jefferson's Original Dance Hall Mix)" - 6:48
"Never Knew Love (Reverend Jefferson Mix)" - 7:12

2004 compilation albums
Oleta Adams compilation albums